Balnacra is a village in Strathcarron, Ross-Shire, Scotland, roughly seven miles from the village of Lochcarron. It is in the Scottish council area of Highland.

References

Populated places in Ross and Cromarty